Muirshearlich is a small hamlet, 4 miles northeast of Fort William, along the B8004 road, in Lochaber, Scottish Highlands and is in the council area of Highland.

References

Populated places in Lochaber